San Isabel National Forest is located in central Colorado.

It is one of eleven national forests in the state of Colorado and contains the Sawatch Range, the Collegiate Peaks, and Sangre de Cristo Range. It has a total area of 1,120,233 acres (1,750.36 sq mi, or 4,533.42 km²) spread out over parts of eleven counties in central Colorado. In descending order of land area it is located in Chaffee, Custer, Lake, Huerfano, Fremont, Pueblo, Saguache, Las Animas, Park, Costilla, and Summit counties.

San Isabel National Forest is co-managed by the Forest Service together with Pike National Forest, Cimarron National Grassland, and Comanche National Grassland from offices in Pueblo. There are local ranger district offices located in Cañon City, Leadville, and Salida.

Wilderness areas
There are seven officially designated wilderness areas lying within San Isabel National Forest that are part of the National Wilderness Preservation System. Four of them extend into neighboring National Forests, and of these, one also onto land under management of the National Park Service. Another one extends onto land of the United States Fish and Wildlife Service (as indicated).
 Buffalo Peaks Wilderness (mostly in Pike NF)
 Collegiate Peaks Wilderness (partly in Gunnison NF; partly in White River NF)
 Greenhorn Mountain Wilderness
 Holy Cross Wilderness (mostly in White River NF)
 Mount Massive Wilderness (partly in Leadville National Fish Hatchery)
 Sangre de Cristo Wilderness (partly in Rio Grande NF; partly in Great Sand Dunes National Park)
 Spanish Peaks Wilderness

References

External links

Pike and San Isabel National Forests and Cimarron and Comanche National Grasslands (United States Forest Service)

 
National Forests of Colorado
National Forests of the Rocky Mountains
Protected areas established in 1902
Protected areas of Chaffee County, Colorado
Protected areas of Custer County, Colorado
Protected areas of Lake County, Colorado
Protected areas of Huerfano County, Colorado
Protected areas of Fremont County, Colorado
Protected areas of Pueblo County, Colorado
Protected areas of Saguache County, Colorado
Protected areas of Las Animas County, Colorado
Protected areas of Park County, Colorado
Protected areas of Costilla County, Colorado
Protected areas of Summit County, Colorado